AIDAsol is a Sphinx class cruise ship, built at Meyer Werft for AIDA Cruises. She is the fifth Sphinx series ship, preceded by sisters AIDAdiva, AIDAbella, AIDAluna, and AIDAblu, and followed by AIDAmar. AIDAsol was delivered in March 2010. She was christened on 9 April 2011.

Concept and Construction
AIDAsol was ordered on 13 December 2007, together with her unnamed sister, at Meyer Werft by Carnival Corporation & plc, the parent company of AIDA. It also marked the decision to increase the tonnage and capacity of the then under construction AIDAblu, to 71,000-GT and 2,174 passengers, which makes AIDAsol and AIDAmar her twin sisters in the Sphinx class. The naming ceremony was on 9 April 2011 in Kiel, Germany.

AIDAsol is similarly designed from her latest predecessor, AIDAblu. Facilities included are an additional deck, an onboard brewery and a 2,300-m2 spa facility. AIDAsol is 252 meters in length and 32 meters wide.

References

External links

 Shipyard webcam
 "Aidasol undergoes its baptism in Kiel" - Reise News
 "In-vehicle Breweries" - THB
 "A Pout is baptized in Kiel" - SHZ
 "Aida Crusaders set sail for the Black and the Red Sea" - Hamburger Abendblatt

Ships of AIDA Cruises
2011 ships
Ships built in Papenburg